Dolicharthria hieralis is a moth in the family Crambidae. It was described by Charles Swinhoe in 1904. It is found on Borneo.

References

Moths described in 1904
Spilomelinae
Moths of Asia